Ha Do-kwon (born Kim Yong-goo on March 3, 1977) is a South Korean actor. He is mainly known for his roles in Hot Stove League and The Penthouse: War in Life.

Education
Ha graduated from Seoul National University in 2004, majoring in vocal music.

Personal life
On an episode of Same Bed, Different Dreams 2 aired on March 24, 2020, Ha revealed that he has been married to Yeo Min-jeong for 16 years.

Filmography

Film

Television series

Web series

Television show

Awards and nominations

Notes

References

External links
 Official website (935 Entertainment)
 Ha Do-kwon at HanCinema

1977 births
Living people
South Korean male television actors
South Korean male film actors
South Korean male web series actors
Seoul National University alumni